Parent-Craft is a British television programme which aired on the BBC in 1951. It was a fortnightly comedy series. It starred Janet Burnell, William Mervyn, Shirley Eaton, James Fox, and Robert Morley. The series is missing, believed lost. All shows aired live, and while the ability to record live television was developed by late 1947, the technology wasn't considered of acceptable quality by the BBC until around the mid-1950s.

References

External links
Parent-Craft on IMDb

1950s British comedy television series
1951 British television series debuts
1951 British television series endings
Lost BBC episodes
BBC Television shows
Black-and-white British television shows
BBC television comedy
British live television series